Apulu, also shortened as Aplu, is the Etruscan god of Sun and health (or plague), equivalent to the Greco-Roman god Apollo.

In other cultures

Greco-Roman equivalent 

The national divinity of the Greeks, Apollo has been recognized as a god of archery, music and dance, truth and prophecy, healing and diseases, the Sun and light, poetry, and more.

Medicine and healing are associated with Apollo, whether through the god himself or mediated through his son Asclepius. Apollo delivered people from epidemics, yet he is also a god who could bring ill-health and deadly plague with his arrows. The invention of archery itself is credited to Apollo and his sister Artemis. Apollo is also an important pastoral deity, and was the patron of herdsmen and shepherds. Protection of herds, flocks and crops from diseases, pests and predators were his primary duties.

As the god of mousike, Apollo presides over all music, songs, dance and poetry. 
On the other hand, Apollo also encouraged founding new towns and establishment of civil constitution. He is associated with dominion over colonists. He was the giver of laws, and his oracles were consulted before setting laws in a city.

Hittite equivalent 

Aplu may be related with Apaliunas, who is considered to be the Hittite reflex of *Apeljōn, an early form of the name “Apollo”.

See also 
 Agyieus
 Etruscan deities, Aplu
 Fufluns

Notes and references

Notes

References 

Apollo
Epithets of Apollo
Sky and weather gods
Plague gods